St. Catherine of Siena is a Roman Catholic church in the Riverside section of Greenwich, Connecticut. It is now part of the Parish of St. Catherine of Siena and St. Agnes within the Diocese of Bridgeport.

St. Catherine´s has an annual carnival for one week in June or July.

History
The original church was established by the then Bishop of Hartford, John Joseph Nilan on May 8, 1913. Nicholas P. Coleman was appointed as the first pastor and helped construct the new church. The church building and rectory were subsequently dedicated the following year. The third pastor, John F. X. Walsh, was influential in guiding the construction of the church at its current location. The very large Colonial-style church was built in 1956 to the designs of the noted New York City- and Stamford-based ecclesiastical architect Gustave E. Steinback. Steinback was a renowned architect and designer of many distinguished churches in New York City and Chicago, and St. Catherine's was his last church design before his death in 1959.

The parish of St. Catherine of Siena and the parish of St. Agnes were canonically merged July 1, 2019. A procession from St. Agnes to St. Catherine to mark the occasion was held on November 24, followed by a Mass celebrated by Bishop Frank Caggiano.

Mass Schedule
The following is the mass schedule for masses held at the St. Catherine campus location:
 Saturday - 5:00 PM
 Sunday - 7:30 AM, 9:00 AM (Family Mass), 10:30 AM, 11:00 AM (French Mass, 2nd Sunday of Month), 11:00 AM (Italian Mass, 3rd Sunday of Month) 5:00 PM
 Daily Mass: Monday, Tuesday, Thursday, and Friday - 7:00 AM, 5:15 PM (In chapel)

References

External links 
 Parish website

Roman Catholic churches completed in 1959
Christian organizations established in 1913
1913 establishments in Connecticut
20th-century Roman Catholic church buildings in the United States
Gustave E. Steinback church buildings
Colonial Revival architecture in Connecticut
Roman Catholic churches in Greenwich, Connecticut
Churches in Fairfield County, Connecticut